White bat may refer to:

Any of the bat species with predominantly white fur:
Honduran white bat, a Central American species in the family Phyllostomidae
Northern ghost bat, a South and Central American species in the family Emballonuridae
Greater ghost bat, a South American species in the family Emballonuridae
Lesser ghost bat, a South American species in the family Emballonuridae
Isabelle's ghost bat, a South American species in the family Emballonuridae
Ghost bat, an Australian species in the family Megadermatidae
White Bat, an album by He Is Legend